Antony William Basil Crockett (born 1956) is a British general practitioner, hospital practitioner and medical writer. He has interests in respiratory disease, particularly asthma and chronic obstructive pulmonary disease. He is the medical director of Allergy Central, a private allergy clinic.  Crockett is a Fellow of the Royal College of General Practitioners.

He is the son of John Crockett, (John Angus Basil) the artist, playwright and television and film director, grandson of Colonel Basil Crockett (Basil Edwin) DSO and William Joseph Stern OBE (civ.), nephew of Colonel Anthony John Stewart Crockett RM, OBE (Mil.), ADC, and a descendant of Blessed Ralph Crockett, an English Martyr.

He attended Downside School and the University of Southampton, graduating in 1980. He practises medicine from his rural practice in Shrivenham, Oxfordshire, where he provided services for the defence academy.  He is married and has two children.

Crockett is the author of a number of works on respiratory medicine topics, with a focus on improving the standard of primary care in this area.  He has lectured on this subject both nationally and internationally.  Dr Crockett founded a primary care group to promote the improvement of the treatment of these conditions by local GPs rather than by resorting to national specialists.

His books include:
Managing Asthma in Primary Care by Antony Crockett.  Oxford ; Boston : Blackwell Scientific Publications 1993. (2nd Ed.)   
Asthma: Your Questions Answered by Antony Crockett.  Edinburgh : New York : Churchill Livingstone, 2003.

References

External links
Elm Tree Surgery
Allergy Central

1956 births
21st-century English medical doctors
Fellows of the Royal College of General Practitioners
British general practitioners
Living people